Professor Adam Beaumont (born August 1972) is a businessman, angel investor, trustee and digital entrepreneur. He is the CEO of telecommunications provider aql, a visiting professor of cyber security at the University of Leeds and the Honorary Consul of the Republic of Estonia to the Northern Powerhouse and the Isle of Man.

Early life and education 
Beaumont was state educated. He was born in Stockport, England.

He has a PhD in Physical Chemistry and a BSc in Colour and Polymer Chemistry from the University of Leeds.

Career 
After completing his PhD, Beaumont began his career at age 24 with a three-year stint as the University of Leeds' youngest lecturer in physical chemistry, including quantum mechanics and thermodynamics.

He then spent some time in secure mobile communications for the Defence Evaluation Research Agency (DERA), an agency of the Ministry of Defence. Beaumont was involved in building the agency's first cyber teams.

Beaumont founded telecommunications platform company aql in 1998, and is the company's CEO.

In 2008, he purchased the Salem Chapel, a 1791 Grade II listed building in the heart of Leeds. Over several years, he restored the building and turned it into the main data hub in the North. The restored chapel houses aql's head office, and has hosted the launch of government initiatives, including the Northern Powerhouse concept and the first Northern Powerhouse Partnership report.

He is a founder and board member of IXLeeds, the UK’s first and only fully independent internet exchange outside London.

In 2015, Beaumont founded not-for-profit investment platform NorthInvest. As an angel investor, he invests between £20,000 and £400,000 in early-stage tech companies, such as CBiS Education, Deekit, ID Health, Memento VR, Gravity Industries, handi and jet-drone company hydra. Northinvest raised over £2m for startups in Q1 2020 and over £9m across that year.

After aql bought Isle of Man-based communications provider BlueWave Communications in 2015, Beaumont became the company's CEO.

Beaumont is active overseas, leading the founding delegation to create UK:Estonia TechLink. More recently he led a delegation of northern business leaders on an April 2017 trade mission to San Francisco as part of the government's Northern Powerhouse initiative.

In January 2018, he helped launch Transport for the North's Strategic Transport Plan to transform transportation in the North of England over the next 30 years.

Honours and other endeavours 
Beaumont was appointed a visiting professor of cyber security at the University of Leeds in October 2017. He is also a governor of Leeds City College. He is a patron of Leeds Community Foundation and the major supporter of Child friendly Leeds

In June 2017, Beaumont was appointed as a Trustee of the Eden Project. He is also a Non Executive Director of the Eden Project International Board - responsible for Eden projects in China, Ireland, Dubai, US. He is a key driver of Eden Project North,

Beaumont was named International Director of the Year 2017 for Yorkshire and the North East by the Institute of Directors. He was named Director of the Year for Innovation in 2018. He was named International Director of the Year in 2019. He was named as a Maserati 100 Entrepreneur in 2019.

He was appointed to the board of the Leeds City Region Enterprise Partnership (LEP) in 2017.

He was named Honorary Consul of the Republic of Estonia to the Northern Powerhouse and the Isle of Man in April 2018. He is also the owner of Porkuni Manor managed by Porkuni Mois OÜ

Beaumont joined the UK5G Advisory Board in March 2018. His mobile network BlueWave received permissions to operate 5G in the Isle of Man

A regular keynote speaker on topics including cyber security and mobile security, Beaumont delivered the opening address at the Huddersfield leg of the Duke of York's prestigious Pitch@Palace entrepreneurship competition in February 2018. In April, he gave two talks at CYBERUK 2018, the National Cyber Security Centre's (NCSC) annual flagship conference.

He is part of Leeds City Region's team that successfully bid on a place on Massachusetts Institute of Technology's (MIT) two-year Regional Entrepreneurship Acceleration Programme (REAP).

In 2018 he created funded the "Beaumont Awards" - an award for outstanding final year research which has the potential to positively impact society, the winners each receiving a medal inspired by the achievements in research-led public education by Michael Faraday.

References 

Living people
1972 births
Alumni of the University of Leeds
Businesspeople from Leeds
21st-century English businesspeople
Technology company founders
British technology company founders